The lion is a common charge in heraldry. It traditionally symbolises courage, nobility, royalty, strength, stateliness and valour, because historically the lion has been regarded as the "king of beasts". The lion also carries Judeo-Christian symbolism. The Lion of Judah stands in the coat of arms of Jerusalem. Similar-looking lions can be found elsewhere, such as in the coat of arms of the Swedish royal House of Bjelbo, from there in turn derived into the coat of arms of Finland, formerly belonging to Sweden.

History

The animal designs in the heraldry of the high medieval period are a continuation of the animal style of the Viking Age, ultimately derived from the style of Scythian art as it developed from c. the 7th century BC. Symmetrically paired animals in particular find continuation from Migration Period art via Insular art to Romanesque art and heraldry.

The animals of the "barbarian" (Eurasian) predecessors of heraldic designs are likely to have been used as clan symbols.
Adopted in Germanic tradition around the 5th century, they were re-interpreted in a Christian context in the western kingdoms of Gaul and Italy in the 6th and 7th centuries. The characteristic of the lion as royal animal in particular is due to the influence of the Physiologus, an early Christian book about animal symbolism, originally written in Greek in the 2nd century and translated into Latin in about AD 400.
It was a predecessor of the medieval bestiaries. At the time, few Europeans had a chance to encounter actual lions, so that painters had to rely on traditional depictions and had no actual animals as models.

The lion as a heraldic charge is present from the very earliest development of heraldry in the 12th century. One of the earliest known examples of armory as it subsequently came to be practiced can be seen on the tomb of Geoffrey Plantagenet, Count of Anjou, who died in 1151. An enamel, probably commissioned by Geoffrey's widow between 1155 and 1160, depicts him carrying a blue shield decorated six golden lions rampant and wearing a blue helmet adorned with another lion. A chronicle dated to c. 1175 states that Geoffrey was given a shield of this description when he was knighted by his father-in-law, Henry I, in 1128.

Earlier heraldic writers attributed the lions of England to William the Conqueror, but the earliest evidence of the association of lions with the English crown is a seal bearing two lions passant, used by the future King John during the lifetime of his father, Henry II, who died in 1189. Since Henry was the son of Geoffrey Plantagenet, it seems reasonable to suppose that the adoption of lions as an heraldic emblem by Henry or his sons might have been inspired by Geoffrey's shield. John's elder brother, Richard the Lionheart, who succeeded his father on the throne, is believed to have been the first to have borne the arms of three lions passant-guardant, still the arms of England, having earlier used two lions rampant combatant, which arms may also have belonged to his father. Richard is also credited with having originated the English crest of a lion statant (now statant-guardant).

Apart from the lions of the Plantagenet (England and Normandy) coat of arms, 12th-century examples of lions used as heraldic charges include the Staufen (Hohenstaufen) and Wittelsbach (Palatinate) coats of arms, both deriving from Henry the Lion, the royal coat of arms of Scotland, attributed to William the Lion,

Coats of arms of the 13th century include those of the House of Sverre (coat of arms of Norway), the Ludovingians (the lion of Hesse used by Conrad of Thuringia), Luxembourg, the kingdom of Ruthenia (Volhynia), the House of Habsburg (the Habsburgs all but abandoned their original coat of arms after gaining the Duchy of Austria in the 1270s, but it remained in use in derived lineages such as the House of Kyburg), the kingdom of Bulgaria and the Armenian Kingdom of Cilicia (Rubenids).

Unlike the eagle, which is comparatively rare in heraldry because it was reserved as an imperial symbol, the lion became a symbol of chivalry and was not restricted to royal coats of arms. The Zürich armorial (14th century) has a number of coats of arms with lions, most of them of ministeriales of the House of Habsburg.

The lion in the coat of arms of Bohemia is depicted with two tails (à la queue fourchée). According to Ménestrier, this is due to a jest made by Emperor Frederick, who granted Vladislaus II, Duke of Bohemia a coat of arms with a lion coué, that is, with its tail between its legs. Vladislaus' men refused to follow this emblem, calling it an ape, so that Frederick agreed to improve the arms by giving the lion not just one but two erect tails.

Attitudes
As many attitudes (positions) now exist in heraldry as the heraldist's imagination can conjure, as a result of the ever-increasing need for differentiation, but very few of these were apparently known to medieval heralds. One distinction commonly made (especially among French heralds), although it may be of limited importance, is the distinction of lions in the walking positions as leopards. The following table summarizes the principal attitudes of heraldic lions:

Other terms are used to describe the lion's position in further detail. Each coat of arms has a right and left (i.e. dexter and sinister) side - with respect to the person carrying the shield - so the left side of the shield as drawn on the page (thus the right side to the shield bearer) is called the dexter side. The lion's head is normally seen in agreement with the overall position, facing dexter (left) unless otherwise stated. If a lion's whole body is turned to face right, he is to sinister or contourné. If his whole body faces the viewer, he is affronté. If his head only faces the viewer he is guardant or gardant, and if he looks back over his shoulder he is regardant. These adjectives follow any other adjectives of position.

A lion (or other beast) coward carries the tail between its hind legs. The tail also may be knotted (nowed), forked (queue fourchée), doubled (double-queued; as in the arms of the kingdom of Bohemia), or cut off (defamed).

Variants
In addition to the attitudes it is depicted in, a certain variety is present in heraldic lions regarding the presence of additional physical features. Beyond the presence of double or forked tails, heraldic lions are sometimes depicted with two heads, as in the case of the arms of the Mason of Birmingham, from whom they were passed to the University of Birmingham. Alternatively, a lion may be depicted with one head connected to two distinct bodies, in which case it its termed bicorporated. If the conjoined bodies are three, the lion is instead termed tricorporated. These multi-bodied lions, however, are very rare. Also, the claws and tongue of the lion may be described as a different tincture than a "proper" lion. If the claws are a different color, it is said to be armed of that tincture, and if the tongue is a different color it is langued of that tincture. For example, the blazon of the monarch of Scotland is Or, a lion gules, within a double tressure flory counter-flory of the same, armed and langued azure.The arms of the Cinque Ports depict lions dimidiated with the hulks of ships, incorporating the front half of the lion and the rear of the vessel. This was originally the result of the joining of the lions or of the royal arms of England with the ships argent of the arms of the townships of the Ports. Over time, the conjoined figure came to be considered as a single heraldic charge in itself, and granted as such as new charges.

Winged lions are depicted in arms as both passant and, more commonly, sejant, and also appear as supporters. This figure is commonly referred to as the Lion of Saint Mark, although Arthur Fox-Davies defined as a Lion of Saint Mark one present in a specifically religious context and depicted with a halo. The winged lion is the traditional symbol of Venice, whose patron saint is Mark the Evangelist.

A sea-lion, also called a morse, is depicted with the tail of a fish replacing its hindquarters, hind legs and tail. It is described as naiant when depicted horizontally, and as resurgent when rising from water. They typically appear as supporters, but are also known as charges and crests. The lion-dragon is a lion with the lower body, hind legs, wings and tail of a wyvern, although Fox-Davies doubted the existence of this figure outside of heraldry books and reported not to know of any actual use of it. The man-lion, also called a lympago, possesses a human face.

Lions vs. leopards

Both lions and leopards may have been among the earliest beasts to appear in heraldry. The Oxford Guide to Heraldry notes that the earliest English treatise on heraldry, a late-13th or early-14th century Anglo-Norman manuscript titled De Heraudrie, mentions the crow, eagle, griffin, heron, leopard, lion, martlet, popinjay, and swan. Citing Bado Aureo, the Oxford Guide further suggests that the leopard, said to be "borne of an adulterous union between a lioness and a pard," and like a mule incapable of reproducing, may be an appropriate charge for a person born of adultery or barred from reproducing (such as an abbot).

As a general rule, English heralds tend to identify lions as rampant (upright, in profile facing dexter), and leopards as passant guardant (walking, head turned to full face), but the heraldic distinction between lions and leopards is often ambiguous and in some cases may be controversial (as in the case of the royal arms of England, discussed below). Part of the confusion arises from international differences in translation or in the defining characteristics of each, particularly in charges that show some characteristics of each.

English herald Arthur Charles Fox-Davies asserted in 1909 that the leopard, denoting a lion passant guardant, was a term of French origin that had "long since become obsolete in English armory. In French blazon, however, the old distinction is still observed." Fox-Davies continued, "[French heralds] term our lion passant a léopard-lionné and our lion rampant guardant is their lion-léopardé." Dutch heraldist Johannes Rietstap, however, defined a Léopard lionné as a lion rampant guardant (i.e., upright like a lion with its head turned to full face like a leopard) and a Lion léopardé as a lion passant (i.e., walking like a leopard with its head facing dexter like a lion). German-American heraldist Carl-Alexander von Volborth agrees with Rietstap's translations, in contrast to those of Fox-Davies as stated above.

As if to clarify the situation, English heraldist Hugh Clark wrote in his Introduction to Heraldry (1829):

English heraldist Charles Boutell wrote in 1890 that the lions of England were generally termed leopards until the end of the 14th century, including in the roll of arms of Henry III of England, and in a statute of Edward I of England, dating to 1300, which made reference to "signée de une teste de leopart—marked with the King's lion." In English Heraldry (1867), Boutell explained:

In Heraldry: Sources, Symbols and Meaning (1976), German heraldist Ottfried Neubecker explained:

According to Neubecker, what in Old French is termed a léopard is always guardant (head turned toward the observer), thus the modern English heraldic terms "lion passant guardant", "lion passant", and "lion rampant guardant" correlate to the Old French terms léopard, lion léopardé, and léopard lionné'', respectively.

Gallery

Lions as heraldic charge

Lions rampant
A small group of examples is depicted listed below.

Lions passant

Lions couchant

Lions in crest

Lions as supporters
Western depictions

Heraldic lions have also found their way onto municipal or county seals in the United States.

Eastern depictions
Outside of classical heraldry, lions have also found their way onto the coats of arms or emblems used by modern states in Asia, often based on traditional depictions of lions in the respective cultures or regions.

See also 

Leo Belgicus
Lion of Judah
Gallery of flags with one or more lions
Heraldry of León
Marzocco
The Lion and the Unicorn
Snow Lion

Notes

References

Bibliography

 Also at 
 
 
 

 
 

 
 ; as illustrated in 
 
 

Heraldic beasts
 
Heraldry